Snow Island or Isla Nevada is a completely ice-covered island,  in size, lying  southwest of Livingston Island in the South Shetland Islands. Surface area .  This island was known to both American and British sealers as early as 1820, and the name has been well established in international usage for over 100 years.

Maps
 Chart of South Shetland including Coronation Island, &c. from the exploration of the sloop Dove in the years 1821 and 1822 by George Powell Commander of the same. Scale ca. 1:200000. London: Laurie, 1822

See also 
 Composite Antarctic Gazetteer
 List of Antarctic islands south of 60° S
 SCAR
 Territorial claims in Antarctica

References

External links 
 SCAR Composite Antarctic Gazetteer

 
Islands of the South Shetland Islands